Phoradendron capitellatum, the downy mistletoe or hairy mistletoe, is a hemiparasitic plant native to Arizona, New Mexico, Chihuahua and Sonora. It is distinguished by having short, densely puberulent leaves usually less than 3 cm long. Flowers are also pubescent. Berries are pink to white, about 3 mm in diam.

References

capitellatum
Parasitic plants
Flora of Arizona
Flora of New Mexico
Flora of Chihuahua (state)
Flora of Sonora